The 2018 WAFU Zone B Women's Cup was the maiden edition of the international women's football event for teams from Zone B of the West African Football Union (WAFU). The competition was hosted by Ivory Coast at three match venues. Ghana defeated Ivory Coast in the final, making them simultaneously champions of both the men's and women's regional tournaments. Portia Boakye was the top scorer with four goals.

Draw
The draw was held on 9 January in Abidjan. Six of WAFU's Zone B members entered a team (Benin did not enter), with Mali and Senegal (from Zone A) being invited to make up the numbers.

Group stage

Group A

Group B

Knockout stage

Semifinals

Third place

Final

Top scorers 

4 goals

 Portia Boakye

3 goals

 Rasheedat Ajibade
 Ines Nrehy
 Janet Egyir
 Chinaza Uchendu

2 goals

 Grace Asantewaa
 Priscilla Okyere
 Jane Ayieyam
 Mariama Diedhiou
 Nina Kpaho
 Aguecha Diarra
 Fatoumata Diarra
 Bassira Touré
 Salimata Simporé

References

West African Football Union competitions
 
2018 in Ivorian sport
2018 in women's association football